Shell Falls is a waterfall in the Bighorn National Forest on Shell Creek, about halfway down Shell Canyon, and a few miles upstream from the town of Shell in northeast Wyoming.

From the rest area and interpretive center, one can see outcrops of the Cambrian flathead sandstone, about 550 million years old, resting on 2.9 billion year old Precambrian rocks—some of the oldest rocks on earth. Visitors can also see "Copman's Tomb", a massive limestone promontory to the north.

See also
 Shell Creek

References

External links
PDF Brochure Shell Falls
Bighorn National Forest Official Site
Go Waterfalling Site
Waterfalls-Guide.com

Protected areas of Big Horn County, Wyoming
Waterfalls of Wyoming
Landforms of Big Horn County, Wyoming